Yelena or Jelena is a feminine given name. It is the Russian form of Helen, written Елена in Russian.

Notable people called Yelena 
Yelena Afanasyeva (athlete) (born 1967), former Russian athlete who competed in the 800 metres
Yelena Vladimirovna Afanasyeva (born 1975), member of the State Duma of Russia
Yelena Akhaminova, former volleyball player for the Soviet Union
Yelena Andreevna, play by the Russian playwright Anton Chekhov
Yelena Andreyuk, former volleyball player for the USSR
Yelena Antonova (rower) (born 1952), rower from the Soviet Union
Yelena Arshintseva (born 1971), retired female race walker from Russia
Yelena Azarova (born 1973), Russian Synchro-swimmer
Yelena Baranova (born 1972), Russian professional basketball player
Yelena Baturina (born 1963), Russian oligarch, Russia's richest woman
Yelena Bekman-Shcherbina (1882–1951), Russian pianist, composer and teacher
Yelena Belevskaya (born 1963), retired athlete who represented the USSR until 1991 and Belarus since 1992
Yelena Belova (biathlete) (born 1965), Russian former biathlete who competed in the 1992 Winter Olympics
Yelena Belyakova (born 1976), former pole vaulter from Russia
Yelena Bet (born 1976), Belarusian sprint canoeist who competed in the early to mid-2000s
Yelena Bolsun (born 1983), Russian female sprint athlete
Yelena Bondarchuk (1962–2009), Soviet and Russian stage and film actress
Yelena Bonner (1923–2011), human rights activist in the former Soviet Union, wife of dissident Andrei Sakharov
Yelena Burukhina (born 1977), former Russian cross country skier who has competed since 1996
Yelena Leonova (born 1973), former Soviet pair skater
Yelena Chernykh (1979–2011), Russian theatre actress
Yelena Churakova (born 1986), Russian track and field athlete who specialises in the 400 metres hurdles
Yelena Prokopcuka (born 1976), Latvian long-distance runner, won the New York City Marathon in 2005 and 2006
Yelena Smurova (born 1974), Russian water polo player, who won the bronze medal at the 2000 Summer Olympics
Yelena Soboleva (born 1982), Russian middle distance runner who specializes in the 1500 metres
Yelena Davydova (born 1961), former Soviet gymnast
Yelena Dembo (born 1983), Greek International Master of chess
Yelena Dendeberova (born 1969), former medley swimmer from the Soviet Union, Olympic silver medallist
Yelena Dmitriyeva (born 1983), Russian team handball player, playing on the Russian women's national handball team
Yelena Drapeko (born 1948), Russian actress
Yelena Dudina, Soviet sprint canoeist who competed in the mid-1980s
Yelena Glikina (born 1969), Soviet fencer
Yelena Godina (born 1977), Russian volleyball player
Yelena Gorchakova (1933–2002), Soviet athlete who competed mainly in the javelin throw event
Yelena Grishina (born 1968), Soviet fencer
Yelena Gruzinova (born 1967), retired female race walker from Russia
Yelena Gulyayeva, née Rodina (born 1967), retired Russian high jumper
Yelena Guryeva (born 1958), field hockey player and Olympic medalist
Yelena Ilyukhina (born 1982), Kazakhstani handball player
Yelena Isinbayeva (born 1982), Russian pole vaulter
Yelena Jemayeva (born 1971), Azerbaijani fencer
Yelena Sokolova (long jumper) (born 1986), Russian long jumper
Yelena Kashcheyeva (born 1973), Kazakhstani long jumper
Yelena Khanga (born 1961), author of Soul to Soul: The Story of a Black Russian American Family: 1865 - 1992
Yelena Khloptseva (born 1960), Russian rower and Olympic champion
Yelena Kondakova (born 1957), the third Soviet/Russian female cosmonaut to travel to space
Yelena Konevtseva (born 1981), female hammer thrower from Russia
Yelena Konshina (born 1950), Russian composer and music educator
Yelena Korban (born 1961), retired track and field sprinter from the Soviet Union
Yelena Koreneva (born 1953), Russian actress
Yelena Krivoshey (born 1977), Russian gymnast
Yelena Kruglova (born 1962), former Soviet swimmer
Yelena Ksenofontova (born 1972), Russian stage and film actress, Honored Artist of Russia (2006)
Yelena Kurzina (born 1960), Belarusian slalom canoeist who competed in the mid-1990s
Yelena Alexandrovna Kuzmina (1909–1979), Soviet actress
Yelena Kuznetsova (born 1977), female race walker from Kazakhstan
Yelena Lanskaya, American film director, producer and editor
Yelena Lebedenko (born 1971), retired Russian heptathlete and triple jumper
Yelena Lebedeva (born 1977), Uzbekistani sprint canoeist who competed in the mid-1990s
Yelena Leuchanka (born 1983), Belarusian professional women's basketball player
Yelena Maglevannaya (born 1981), Russian free-lance journalist for the newspaper Svobodnoye Slovo, Free Speech, in Volgograd
Yelena Masyuk (born 1966), Russian television journalist, covered the First and Second Chechen Wars and her 1997 abduction
Yelena Matiyevskaya (born 1961), Russian former rower who competed in the 1980 Summer Olympics
Yelena Melnikova (born 1971), Russian former biathlete who competed in the 1992 Winter Olympics
Yelena Migunova (born 1984), in Kazan is a Russian sprint athlete
Yelena Mikulich (born 1977), Belarus rower
Yelena Miroshina (1974–1995), female diver from Russia
Yelena Motalova (born 1971), long-distance runner from Russia
Yelena Mukhina (born 1960), Soviet Gymnast 
Yelena Nechayeva (born 1979), Russian fencer
Yelena Nikolayeva (born 1966), Russian race walker
 Yelena Nikolayeva (journalist) (born 1985)
Yelena Ovchinnikova (born 1982), Russian competitor in synchronized swimming
Yelena Alexandrovna Panova, often Elena Panova (born 1979), professional female bodybuilder from Voronezh, Russia
Yelena Viktorovna Panova also Elena Panova (born 1977), Russian actress from Arkhangelsk
Yelena Parfenova (born 1974), Kazakhstani triple jumper
Yelena Parkhomenko (born 1982), Azerbaijani volleyball player
Yelena Partova (born 1985), Kazakhstani handball player
Yelena Pavlova (born 1978), female volleyball player from Kazakhstan
Yelena Pershina (born 1963), retired female long jumper from Kazakhstan
Yelena Petrova (born 1966), Russian former judoka who competed in the 1992 Summer Olympics
Yelena Petushkova (1940–2007), Russian and former Soviet equestrian who won three Olympic medals
Yelena Plotnikova (born 1978), female volleyball player from Russia
Yelena Polenova (1850–1898), Russian painter and designer, sister of Vasily Polenov
Yelena Posevina (born 1986), Russian gymnast and Olympic champion
Yelena Priyma (born 1983), female hammer thrower from Russia
Yelena Produnova, also known as Elena, (born 1980), female Russian gymnast
Yelena Prokhorova (born 1978), Russian heptathlete who won a silver medal at the 2000 Summer Olympics
Yelena Romanova (1963–2007), Russian middle distance runner
Yelena Rudkovskaya (born 1973), Belarusian swimmer and Olympic champion
Yelena Sokolova (long-distance runner) (born 1979), Russian long-distance runner
Yelena Ruzina (born 1964), retired athlete who competed mainly in the 400 metres
Yelena Safonova (born 1956), Russian actress
Yelena Sayko (born 1967), retired female race walker from Russia
Yelena Shalamova (born 1982), Russian rhythmic gymnast
Yelena Shalygina (born 1986), Kazakh wrestler
Yelena Shubina (born 1974), Russian former swimmer who competed in the 1992 Summer Olympics
Yelena Shushunova (1969–2018), Russian (former Soviet) gymnast, World, European, and Olympic Champion
Yelena Sidorchenkova (born 1980), Russian long-distance runner who specializes in the 3000 metres steeplechase
Yelena Sipatova (born 1955), retired long-distance runner from the Soviet Union
Yelena Skrynnik, First female Minister of Agriculture of the Russian Federation between March 2009 and May 2012
Yelena Slesarenko, née Sivushenko (born 1982), Russian high jumper
Yelena Soboleva (born 1982), Russian middle distance runner who specializes in the 1500 metres
Yelena Solovey (born 1947), Soviet film actress
Yelena Soya, Russian Synchro-swimmer
Yelena Suyazova (born 1989), team handball player from Kazakhstan
Yelena Svezhentseva (born 1968), retired female javelin thrower from Uzbekistan
Yelena Antonova (synchronised swimmer) (born 1974), Russian Synchro-swimmer
Yelena Taranova (born 1961), Azerbaijani paralympic sport shooter, silver medalist of 2000 Summer Paralympics
Yelena Tereshina (born 1959), Soviet rower
Yelena Terleyeva (born 1985), USSR) Russian singer, best known for her hit "Solntse"
Yelena Tissina (born 1977), Russian sprint canoeist who competed in the late 1990s and early 2000s
Yelena Tregubova (born 1973), Russian journalist, a critic of the president Vladimir Putin and his environment
Yelena Tripolski (born 1967), Israeli Olympic sport shooter
Yelena Trofimenko (born 1964), Belorussian film director, producer, screenwriter, author, actress, poet
Yelena Tyurina (born 1971), retired female volleyball player from Russia
Yelena Välbe, née Trubitsyna (born 1968), Russian former cross-country skier
Yelena Vasilevskaya (born 1978), Russian volleyball player
Yelena Vinogradova (born 1964), female track and field athlete who represented the Soviet Union
Yelena Volkova (swimmer) (born 1968), Soviet swimmer and world champion
Yelena Volkova (volleyball) (born 1960), former Soviet volleyball player and Olympic gold medalist
Yelena Yefimova (born 1948), Russian artist and sculptor and a member of the National Association of Art crafts and Guild masters
Yelena Yelesina (born 1970), female high jumper from Russia
Yelena Yemchuk (born 1970), professional photographer, painter and film director, known for her work with The Smashing Pumpkins
Yelena Yudina (born 1988), Russia skeleton racer who has been competing since 2005
Yelena Zadorozhnaya (born 1977), Russian runner who specializes in the 3000, 5000 metres and 3000 metres steeplechase
Yelena Zakharova (born 1975), Russian actress
Yelena Zhupiyeva-Vyazova (born 1960), retired female track and field athlete from Ukraine

Fictional characters
Yelena (Attack on Titan), a character in the manga series Attack on Titan
Yelena Belova, a character in the Marvel comics universe using the codename Black Widow

See also
 Jelena, a given name

External links 
Yelena at Behind the Name
Yelena at Thinkbabynames

Russian feminine given names